The 1903 Oregon Webfoots football team represented the University of Oregon in the 1903 college football season. It was the Webfoots' tenth season; they competed as an independent and were led by head coach Warren W. Smith. They finished the season with a record of four wins, two losses and one tie (4–2–1).

Schedule

References

Oregon
Oregon Ducks football seasons
Oregon Webfoots football